Aforia hypomela is a species of sea snail, a marine gastropod mollusc in the family Cochlespiridae.

Description
The length of the shell attains 59 mm.

(Original description) The thin shell has a fusiform shape. Its color is white with a very thin straw-colored epidermis. The 1½ whorls in the protoconch are white and vitreous, polished, nearly smooth with
faint spiral lines and lines of growth. The seven whorls of the teleoconch are spirally sculptured with a moderate angulation just behind the periphery of the body whorl, which becomes sharper and peripheral on the earlier whorls. In front of this, the whorls are ornamented with numerous rounded threads, separated by much wider somewhat channelled interspaces. On the upper whorls there are 3-6 of these threads, on the body whorl they extend to the anterior end of the siphonal canal, becoming more crowded anteriorly. Behind the carina the shell is smoother, there are faint spirals, hardly raised, and sparser over the centre of the fasciole than on each side of it. There is no distinct secondary striation. The transverse sculpture consists of faint incremental lines, which rise more or less into little wrinkles at the suture, and sometimes undulate the peripheral angulation on the apical whorls. The suture is distinct. The whorls are moderately full. The aperture is ovate. The siphonal canal is nearly straight, not wide. The thin, simple columella is so twisted as to form a pervious coil extending the whole length of the axis. The outer lip is thin, modified by the sculpture The notch is wide, shallow, half-way between the suture and the carina. The outer lip strongly arched forward.

Distribution
This marine species is found in European waters off the British Isles, in the Atlantic Ocean off West Africa and the Sargasso Sea, and in the Caribbean Sea off Cuba.

References

 Bouchet, Philippe, and Anders Warén. "Revision of the northeast Atlantic bathyal and abyssal Turridae (Mollusca, Gastropoda)." Journal of Molluscan Studies 46.Supplement 8 (1980): 1–119.
 Gofas, S.; Le Renard, J.; Bouchet, P. (2001). Mollusca. in: Costello, M.J. et al. (eds), European Register of Marine Species: a check-list of the marine species in Europe and a bibliography of guides to their identification. Patrimoines Naturels. 50: 180–213

External links
 

hypomela
Gastropods described in 1889